Cedar Grove is an unincorporated community in Pickett County, Tennessee, United States.

References

Unincorporated communities in Pickett County, Tennessee
Unincorporated communities in Tennessee